William Henry Perry (July 28, 1886 – July 18, 1956), nicknamed "Socks," was an American baseball outfielder. He played professional baseball for 11 years from 1905 to 1915, including 13 games in Major League Baseball with the Detroit Tigers in 1912.

Early years
Perry was born in 1886 in Howell, Michigan.

Professional baseball player
In 1912, Perry played in 13 games for the Detroit Tigers, seven as the backup center fielder to Ty Cobb, and the rest as a pinch-hitter.  Perry had a .167 career batting average, not good enough to compete for playing time in center field with Cobb.

Perry began his career in 1905 as a pitcher, but made a good showing as an outfielder with the Grand Rapids Orphans of the Central League. He was rated as "the best outfielder in the Central". He was purchased from Grand Rapids by the Detroit Tigers in late 1905 or early 1906 but did not appear in any games. The Tigers then sold him to the Indianapolis Indians of the American Association, with whom he signed in March 1906.

During his 11-year career, Perry played minor league baseball for the Grand Rapids Orphans (1905-1906), Indianapolis Indians (1906), Canton Chinamen and Watchmakers (1907-1908), York White Roses (1909), Sacramento Sacts (1910), Providence Grays (1911-1912), Buffalo Bisons (1913), Jersey City Skeeters (1913), Syracuse Stars (1914), and Bay City Beavers (1915). 

He had his best season in 1911 when he compiled a .343 batting average with 21 triples in 140 games at Providence. He earned the title Independent League Batting Champ that year.

Later years
Perry died in 1956 at age 69 in Pontiac, Michigan. His body was donated to the University of Michigan Medical School.

References

1886 births
1956 deaths
Detroit Tigers players
Baseball players from Michigan
People from Howell, Michigan
Major League Baseball center fielders
Grand Rapids Orphans players
Indianapolis Indians players
Grand Rapids Wolverines players
Canton Chinamen players
Canton Watchmakers players
Sacramento Sacts players
Providence Grays (minor league) players
Buffalo Bisons (minor league) players
Jersey City Skeeters players
Syracuse Stars (minor league baseball) players
Sportspeople from Metro Detroit